Andrea Mónica Montenegro DeFreitas, known as Andrea Montenegro (born 4 March 1969 in Lima, Peru), is a Peruvian actress and model well known for her participation in various telenovelas such as Zorro, la Espada y la Rosa, Latin Lover (2001), La viuda de la Mafia (2004) and currently in Telemundo's El Clon. She has a daughter Muriel and a son Amaru.

Filmography

Telenovelas
 2012 - A Corazón Abierto .... Dra. Carreño
 2010 - El Clon. Nazira
 2009 - Kdabra .... Grimberg
 2008 - Tiempo final .... Claudia
 2007 - Zorro: La Espada y la Rosa .... María Pía de la Vega
 2006 - Amores de mercado .... Mireya
 2005 - Milagros .... Erika Zevallos
 2004 - La viuda de la mafia .... Clara María "Clarabella" López
 2003 - La mujer de Lorenzo .... Isabela
 2001 - Latin Lover .... Claudia Fuentes

References

Peruvian telenovela actresses
Peruvian television actresses
1969 births
Living people